The 1995 German Formula Three Championship was a multi-event motor racing championship for single-seat open wheel formula racing cars that held across Europe. The championship featured drivers competing in two-litre Formula Three racing cars built by Dallara which conform to the technical regulations, or formula, for the championship. It commenced on 22 April May at Hockenheimring and ended at the same place on 15 October after eight double-header rounds.

KMS driver Norberto Fontana became the first Argentine champion and the first champion from Americas. He dominated the season, winning ten of 16 races. Ralf Schumacher finished as runner-up with wins at Norisring and Diepholz Airfield Circuit, losing 85 points to Fontana. Massimiliano Angelelli also won at Norisring, completing the top-three in the drivers' championship. While Jarno Trulli, who spent his first two rounds in the B-Cup won both races in the season finale at Hockenheim. Jakob Sund won the title in B-Cup with just two-point advantage of Tim Bergmeister.

Teams and drivers
All drivers competed in Dallara chassis, model listed.
{|
|

Calendar
With the exception of round at Magny-Cours in France, all rounds took place on German soil.

Results

Notes

Championship standings

A-Class
Points are awarded as follows:

† — Drivers did not finish the race, but were classified as they completed over 90% of the race distance.

References

External links
 

German Formula Three Championship seasons
Formula Three season